Telford Central railway station serves the town of Telford, Shropshire, England. It is situated close to the Telford Shopping Centre, the main commercial district of the town.

History
Telford was designated as a new town in the 1960s and, until the 1980s, was served by two stations which predated its foundation: Oakengates and Wellington railway stations.  Wellington was at one stage renamed "Wellington-Telford West" to indicate that it was located in the new town. (Until 1985, the line through the designated area also had a 'halt station' called New Hadley Halt, between Oakengates and Wellington.)

The situation changed in May 1986, when Telford Central opened.  The new station was equipped with full-length platforms to accommodate inter-city trains. The development included a large car park, which took advantage of its location next to the M54 motorway to provide a park and ride facility.  The £700,000 cost was jointly funded by British Rail, the Telford Development Corporation and Shropshire County Council.

The station and car park were built on the former Hollinswood sidings that served the Lilleshall Company and local industry.

Facilities
The station is staffed all week, with the ticket office open Monday - Saturday 06:00 - 19:00 and Sunday 10:00 - 17:00.  A ticket machine is provided in the booking hall for use outside these times and for the collection of pre-paid tickets.  Until Summer 2020, a coffee kiosk and photo booth were located in the main building on Platform 1 (for Wolverhampton and Birmingham), although these were removed and replaced with a set of vending machines. Toilet facilities are also provided on Platform 1, whilst Platform 2 (Shrewsbury and beyond) has bench seating, a ticket machine and a waiting shelter only.  CIS displays, automatic announcements and timetable posters provide train running information on both platforms.  Step-free access is available to both platforms (via lifts and ramps accessed via the footbridge or public roads).

Services
, the Monday-Saturday off-peak service comprised three trains per hour in each direction.  One, operated by Transport for Wales, runs between Birmingham International and Shrewsbury, with alternate trains continuing to Aberystwyth &  or Holyhead via .  The other trains are West Midlands Railway services between Shrewsbury and Birmingham New Street, with one calling at all stations between Shrewsbury and Wolverhampton and the other a limited stop semi-fast express.  Sunday services consist of an hourly fast service (Chester or Aberystwyth to Birmingham International) operated by Transport for Wales and an hourly stopping service (Shrewsbury to Birmingham), operated by West Midlands Trains. There is also a daily service to London Euston and Shrewsbury operated by Avanti West Coast.

Although the station was built to accommodate inter-city trains to/from London Euston, British Rail services ceased in the early 1990s and Virgin Trains West Coast withdrew a short-lived, (trial) daily service between Shrewsbury and London in 2000. A new company, Wrexham & Shropshire, reintroduced express services (to London Marylebone) on 28 April 2008; these were withdrawn on 28 January 2011. In December 2014, Virgin Trains re-introduced two daily services to and from London Euston.

Notes

References

External links

Railway stations in Shropshire
DfT Category C2 stations
Railway stations in Great Britain opened in 1986
Railway stations opened by British Rail
Railway stations served by Transport for Wales Rail
Railway stations served by West Midlands Trains
Telford
Railway stations served by Avanti West Coast